The Jerky Boys (Original Motion Picture Soundtrack) is the original soundtrack album of the 1995 James Melkonian's film The Jerky Boys: The Movie. It was released on January 24, 1995 via Select/Atlantic Records. 

The Jerky Boys had a busy year in 1995; they took the year off as far as recording an album, however. They did not release a new album until they departed from Select Records and signed to Mercury Records for their third album The Jerky Boys 3, which would be released the following year.

Track listing

Notes
Track 7 is a cover of Lenny Kravitz' "Are You Gonna Go My Way?"
Track 8 is a cover of Blondie's "Hanging on the Telephone"
Track 10 is a cover of Black Sabbath's "Symptom of the Universe"

Other songs
These songs did appear in the film but were not included on the soundtrack:
"The Jerky Boys Sample" written by John G. Brennan and performed by the Jerky Boys
"Hard Hats" and "The Jerky Groove" written by Derrick Perkins and performed by Perkins and Paul Karpinski
"The Swing Thing" written by George Romanis
"Neopolitan Mandolin" written by Alessandro Alessandroni

Charts

References

External links

Rock soundtracks
Hip hop soundtracks
The Jerky Boys albums
1995 soundtrack albums
Albums produced by RZA
Comedy film soundtracks
Albums produced by DJ Lethal
Albums produced by Ed Roland
Atlantic Records soundtracks
Albums produced by Andy Ernst
Albums produced by Lenny Kravitz